The Murders in the Rue Morgue is a 1986 made-for-television mystery film directed by Jeannot Szwarc. It is based on "The Murders in the Rue Morgue" by Edgar Allan Poe.

The film was shot in Paris and shown on CBS on December 7, 1986.

Plot

Cast
 George C. Scott as Auguste Dupin
 Rebecca De Mornay as Claire Dupin
 Val Kilmer as Phillipe Huron
 Ian McShane as Prefect of Police
 Neil Dickson as Adolphe Le Bon

Production
Murders in the Rue Morgue was shot in Paris. Location shooting included at Notre Dame Cathedral, the Place de l'Opéra and in Buttes-Chaumont, a park that stands in for the Bois de Boulogne of 1899. About 30% of the film was shot away from the city, such as the prison sequences which were shot in Corbeil, Marne.

Release
Murders in the Rue Morgue was first shown on December 7, 1986 in the United States on CBS at 8pm.

Reception
From contemporary reviews, John J. O'Connor gave the film a positive review finding Scott "persuasive" despite "At times, [Scott] seems to underplay the part but personallity will out, and it does." O'Connor went on to praise "The wonderful period setting and costumes of Paris" while David Epstein's script "sometimes seems to move a bit slowly, but unerringly carries the story forward."
Lane Crockett of The Times found that the film "so dourly straight-forward that the mystery has no kick. All you get is a period-looking Paris of the 1800s and hundrum performances, that like the metronome, could lull you to sleep."  Crockett described director Jeannot Szwarc's direction "does nothing to enlivent the proceedings" finding he was "more prone to capturing the period flavor and less the essence of a mystery." George C. Scott's performance as "something akin to sleep walking." Crockett commented that Val Kilmer "looks sorely out of place with his fresh boyish American looks and minimal acting talent."

Faye B. Zuckerman wrote in the Spokane Chronicle that the film was an "acting triumph for George C. Scott"  and his performance and "a story that will keep you guessing until the final moments" combine to keep you engrossed.".
Michael H. Price reviewed the a home video of the film referring to it as a "unremarkable made-for-television that is helped along by such fine players as George C. Scott, Val Kilmer and Rebecca De Mornay."
Price found compared to the earlier versions, Robert Florey's 1932 version with Bela Lugosi "remains the best."

References

Sources

External links
 

1986 television films
1986 films
1980s English-language films
1980s mystery films
American mystery films
CBS network films
Films based on The Murders in the Rue Morgue
Films directed by Jeannot Szwarc
Films set in Paris
Films shot in Paris